or  is an island in Ibestad Municipality in Troms og Finnmark county, Norway. The island of Andørja lies to the northeast, the Vågsfjorden lies to the north and west, and the Astafjorden lies to the south. The population on Rolla (2001) is 1,078.

Rolla is connected to the neighboring island of Andørja by the undersea Ibestad Tunnel located in Hamnvik. Andørja is then connected to the mainland via the Mjøsund Bridge. There is a ferry connection from Sørrollnes on the western coast to the town of Harstad.

There are two main churches on the island: Ibestad Church in Hamnvik and Sørrollnes Chapel in Sørrollnes.

See also
List of islands of Norway
List of islands of Norway by area

References

Ibestad
Islands of Troms og Finnmark